Bouchoir is a commune in the Somme department in Hauts-de-France in northern France.

Geography

History 
The village of Bouchoir passed into German hands on 27 March 1918 but was recovered by the 8th Canadian Infantry Brigade on 9 August 1918. The New British Cemetery was created just after Armistice to bury the dead from villages south of Bouchoir and the battlefields around it. It contains 763 burials from the First World War and was designed by Sir Herbert Baker.

Population

See also
Communes of the Somme department

References

Communes of Somme (department)